Kha-ra-sho! is the debut studio album by Ukrainian singer Verka Serduchka released in 2003 by Mamamusic. 

The record became one of the most popular releases at that time in post-Soviet states. It sold 500,000 copies and even received a diamond certification in Ukraine. In 2004, the album won in the category "Album of the year" at the Muz-TV Music Awards, for the songs "Hop-Hop" and "Ya ne ponyala" Serdyuchka received the Golden Gramophones.

Track listing

Sales and certifications

References

2003 debut albums
Verka Serduchka albums
Mamamusic albums
Russian-language albums
Ukrainian-language albums